Wallasey is a town within the Metropolitan Borough of Wirral, in Merseyside, England.

Wallasey  may also refer to:

Wallasey (UK Parliament constituency), a constituency in Merseyside
Wallasey (ward), a Wirral Council ward
Wallasey Village, a district of the town of Wallasey